TZ-1, TZ1, or variant, may refer to:

 Phoenix Industries TZ-1 ParaFlyer, a powered parachute
 Alfa Romeo TZ1, a sportscar
 Tianzhou 1, a Chinese spaceflight mission involving the first flight of a Tianzhou space capsule
 UTC+01:00 time zone
 UTC−01:00 time zone

See also
 TZ (disambiguation)